The U.S. Open is an annual golf competition established in 1895, with Horace Rawlins winning the inaugural championship. It is run by the United States Golf Association (USGA). The championship was not held from 1917 to 1918 or from 1942 to 1945 due to World War I and World War II respectively.

The U.S. Open is currently the third of four major championships to be played each year. U.S. Open champions are automatically invited to play in the other three majors (the Masters, the Open Championship (British Open), and the PGA Championship) for the next five years, and earn a ten-year exemption from qualifying for the U.S. Open. They also receive membership on the PGA Tour for the following five seasons and invitations to The Players Championship for the five years following their victories. The champion receives a gold champion's medal, and the U.S. Open Championship Cup, which the winner is allowed to keep for a year.

Willie Anderson, Bobby Jones, Ben Hogan and Jack Nicklaus hold the record for the most U.S. Open victories, with four victories each. Anderson holds the record for most consecutive wins with three (1903–05). Hale Irwin is the oldest winner of the U.S. Open: he was  old when he won in 1990. The youngest winner of the U.S. Open is John McDermott who was  old when he won in 1911. Rory McIlroy holds the record for the lowest aggregate score in 2011 at 268. Rory McIlroy and Brooks Koepka share the record for the lowest score in relation to par with their winning scores of -16. 

The U.S. Open has been won wire-to-wire by seven golfers on eight occasions: 1914 by Walter Hagen, 1921 by Jim Barnes, 1953 by Hogan, 1970 by Tony Jacklin, 2000 and 2002 by Tiger Woods, 2011 by McIlroy, and 2014 by Martin Kaymer. Eight others have led wire-to-wire in nine tournaments if ties after a round are counted: Willie Anderson in 1903, Alex Smith in 1906, Chick Evans in 1916, Tommy Bolt in 1958, Nicklaus in 1972 and 1980, Hubert Green in 1977, Payne Stewart in 1991, and Retief Goosen in 2001.

Champions

By year

Multiple champions

Champions by nationality

Notes 

 Par is a predetermined number of strokes that a golfer should require to complete a hole, a round (the sum of the total pars of the played holes), or a tournament (the sum of the total pars of each round). E stands for even, which means the tournament was completed in the predetermined number of strokes.
 The Championship was played over 36 holes.
 Willie Anderson won in a playoff against Alex Smith.
 Willie Anderson won in a playoff against David Brown.
 Fred McLeod won in a playoff against Willie Smith.
 Alex Smith won in a playoff against John McDermott and Macdonald Smith.
 John McDermott won in a playoff against Mike Brady and George Simpson.
 Francis Ouimet won in a playoff against Harry Vardon and Ted Ray.
 The U.S. Open was not held from 1917 to 1918 because of World War I.
 Walter Hagen won in a playoff against Mike Brady.
 Bobby Jones won in a playoff against Bobby Cruickshank.
 Willie Macfarlane won in a playoff against Bobby Jones.
 Tommy Armour won in a playoff against Harry Cooper.
 Johnny Farrell won in a playoff against Bobby Jones.
 Bobby Jones won in a playoff against Al Espinosa.
 Billy Burke won in a playoff against George von Elm.
 Byron Nelson won in a playoff against Craig Wood and Denny Shute.
 Lawson Little won in a playoff against Gene Sarazen.
 The U.S. Open was not held from 1942 to 1945 because of World War II.
 Lloyd Mangrum won in a playoff against Vic Ghezzi and Byron Nelson.
 Lew Worsham won in a playoff against Sam Snead.
 Ben Hogan won in a playoff against Lloyd Mangrum and George Fazio.
 Jack Fleck won in a playoff against Ben Hogan.
 Dick Mayer won in a playoff against Cary Middlecoff.
 Jack Nicklaus won in a playoff against Arnold Palmer.
 Julius Boros won in a playoff against Jacky Cupit and Arnold Palmer.
 Gary Player won in a playoff against Kel Nagle.
 Billy Casper won in a playoff against Arnold Palmer.
 Lee Trevino won in a playoff against Jack Nicklaus.
 Lou Graham won in a playoff against John Mahaffey.
 Fuzzy Zoeller won in a playoff against Greg Norman.
 Curtis Strange won in a playoff against Nick Faldo.
 Hale Irwin won in a playoff against Mike Donald.
 Payne Stewart won in a playoff against Scott Simpson.
 Ernie Els won in a playoff against Loren Roberts and Colin Montgomerie.
 Retief Goosen won in a playoff against Mark Brooks.
 Tiger Woods won in a playoff against Rocco Mediate.

References 
General

Specific

External links 

USGA website

United States sport-related lists
U.S. Open